Golf de Saint-Cloud is a 36-hole golf complex located in the parishes of Garches, Rueil-Malmaison and Vaucresson, 12 km west of central Paris, France.

History 
Opened in 1913 and designed by well renowned English golf course designer Harry Shapland Colt, the Vert or Green course is a championship course commissioned by Saint-Cloud's then owner, an American lawyer named Henry Cachard. The Estate was previously owned by Empress Joséphine, Napoleon's wife. 

In January 1871, the  bloody Battle of Buzenval, which the Prussians won, was fought on the 15th fairway. During the battle, the painter Henri Regnault, aged 27, was killed, and a bust erected in his honor still sits on hole 14. Hole 8 in particular offers a view of the Eiffel Tower. 

The Jaune or Yellow course, par-67, was added in 1930 and designed by Colt and his associate John S.F. Morrison.

From April 1983, President François Mitterrand played nine holes with Jacques Attali at Saint-Cloud most Monday mornings.

Tournaments 
Saint-Cloud has been home to the French International Lady Juniors Amateur Championship since 1927. It hosted the Open de France, the oldest national open in continental Europe, 13 times between 1926 and 1987.

Professional

Amateur 
French International Lady Juniors Amateur Championship – 1927–
Vagliano Trophy – 19361947
St Andrews Trophy – 1958
European Ladies' Team Championship – 1975

References

External links

Golf clubs and courses in France
Golf clubs and courses designed by Harry Colt
Sports venues in Paris
1913 establishments in France
Sports venues completed in 1913